The 1978 Fischer-Grand Prix was a men's tennis tournament played on indoor hard courts at the Wiener Stadthalle in Vienna, Austria that was part of the 1978 Colgate-Palmolive Grand Prix. It was the fourth edition of the tournament and was held form 23 October until 29 October 1978. Fourth-seeded Stan Smith won the singles title.

Finals

Singles

 Stan Smith defeated  Balázs Taróczy 4–6, 7–6, 7–6, 6–3
 It was Smith's 5th title of the year and the 72nd of his career.

Doubles

 Victor Pecci /  Balázs Taróczy defeated  Bob Hewitt /  Frew McMillan 6–3, 6–7, 6–4
 It was Pecci's 5th title of the year and the 8th of his career. It was Taróczy's 5th title of the year and the 8th of his career.

References

External links
 ATP tournament profile
 ITF tournament edition details

 
Fischer-Grand Prix
Vienna Open
Fischer-Grand Prix
1978 in Austrian tennis